Barry Penner,  is a Canadian licensed lawyer and former politician in the province of British Columbia. He served as a Member of the Legislative Assembly of British Columbia (MLA) for Chilliwack-Hope for 16 years. He also served as Attorney General of British Columbia, Deputy House Leader (2005–2009), Minister of Environment and Minister of Aboriginal Relations and Reconciliation. Barry has also served as chair of the board of directors for the government-owned Insurance Corporation of British Columbia.

Early life and career 
Born in Kitimat in 1966, Penner has lived most of his life in the eastern Fraser Valley of British Columbia, Canada. 
He has fought forest fires, spent summers on patrol as a park ranger and worked at a local saw mill.

Penner completed two years at what is now University of the Fraser Valley (formerly Fraser Valley College) and has been named one of their "Top 40" alumni.  Penner received a number of academic awards while studying at Simon Fraser University in Burnaby before completing a bachelor's degree in Political Science and Economics. He was then selected for the 1989  British Columbia Legislative Internship Program.  While completing a law degree at the University of Victoria, Penner was one of the early participants in the UVic Law Co-operative Education program and worked for a law firm in Bangkok, Thailand in 1991.

Politics 
Penner was first elected as a MLA in 1996 (representing the riding of Chilliwack) and was re-elected in 2001 and 2005 (the riding of Chilliwack-Kent) with some of the highest margins of victory in the province. He was re-elected in the 2009 British Columbia general election to represent the reconfigured Chilliwack-Hope constituency (which includes Agassiz, Harrison Hot Springs and the Fraser Canyon) with more than 53% of votes cast.

As an elected representative, Penner was an early advocate for expanding the use of Canada's DNA database to help identify, catch and convict violent  criminals, and solve cases involving missing persons. He also introduced a motion in the Legislature calling on the BC Government to establish an 'AMBER Alert' system in BC to assist police in safely returning abducted children to their parents. The motion passed in 2003, and the 'AMBER Alert' system became operational in 2004.

Penner became known as an advocate for small-hydro, wind power and other alternative energy sources after helping lead unprecedented community opposition in the Fraser Valley to the proposed Sumas Energy 2 power project.

As an active representative of the community, he also led protests against the NDP Government's decision in 1997 to close the Chilliwack Courthouse. Ultimately, the decision was reversed and a new Courthouse was constructed with the support of the City of Chilliwack. Penner also launched a successful effort to raise awareness of a World War I hero, James Richardson, VC who is the only resident of Chilliwack to have been awarded the Victoria Cross (the highest award for bravery in the face of the enemy in the British Commonwealth). This culminated in a community effort to build a statue of the young piper on the grounds of Chilliwack's former City Hall. Responding to a need for increased road safety, Penner approached the Minister of Transportation to address growing concerns about collisions on Highway 9 near Rosedale. This resulted in the first modern roundabout on a BC highway, reducing accidents and injuries. Penner also worked with the Minister of Transportation to have the first cable barrier on a major highway in British Columbia installed in the constituency he represented. Numerous head-on collisions and possible fatalities have been prevented.

Penner has served as vice-president and President of the Pacific Northwest Economic Region (PNWER) beginning in June 2001, and for five years was British Columbia's lead representative to the organization which consists of three Provinces, five States and two Territories.

In June 2007, Penner announced he would continue working as a Minister while receiving treatment for leiomyosarcoma, a rare type of cancer.

During his time in provincial politics, Penner was recognized by Vancouver Magazine as one of the 50 most influential people in British Columbia.

Post politics 
On August 18, 2011, Penner stepped down as attorney general after deciding against running for another term as MLA, citing a desire to spend more time with his family. He remained as the MLA for Chilliwack-Hope and said he intended to remain as such until the next election. On November 24, 2011, he announced that he would resign in early 2012 as he had accepted a position with the national law firm of Davis LLP (now DLA Piper (Canada) LLP, where he worked on environmental, energy and First Nations issues. He officially resigned his legislative seat on January 9, 2012.

In 2015, he established a legal and public public affairs practice known as Penner Pacific Advisory Services. In November, 2017 he became the managing director of Vancouver International Arbitration Centre. Penner was appointed by the BC Liberal provincial government as chair of the board of directors of Insurance Corporation of British Columbia as of March 31, 2016. He served in that position until July 19, 2017, when the BC Liberals were replaced by a NDP administration.

Penner is currently chair of an inquiry committee of the College of Physicians & Surgeons of British Columbia  and is a past member of their board of directors BC College of Physicians & Surgeons, the oldest self-regulating professional organization in British Columbia (serving from 2015 to 2021). He is past arbiter for the New West Partnership Trade Agreement between British Columbia, Alberta and Saskatchewan.

In 2015, he was named as one of the 'Top 40' alumni from the University of the Fraser Valley, where he attended before graduating from Simon Fraser University and the University of Victoria. In 2021, Penner was recognized as one of the top 500 most influential business leaders in British Columbia by Business in Vancouver magazine.

Personal life 
He has two daughters, Fintry, named after a Provincial Park on Okanagan Lake and Atlin, named after Atlin Provincial Park in northern British Columbia and that includes Atlin Lake, the largest natural lake in the province.

In May 2014, Penner moved to Myanmar (formerly known as Burma) with his family to work for a law firm assisting with inbound investment, particularly in telecommunications and energy. However, he returned with his family to British Columbia for the birth of his second child.

Election results 

|-

|-

|NDP
|Malcolm James
|align="right"|2,155
|align="right"|11.68%
|align="right"|
|align="right"|$3,979

|-

|No Affiliation
|Bob Chisholm
|align="right"|5,736 		
|align="right"|23.44%
|align="right"|
|align="right"|unknown

|- bgcolor="white"
!align="right" colspan=3|Total valid votes
!align="right"|24,467  
!align="right"|100.00%
!align="right"|
|- bgcolor="white"
!align="right" colspan=3|Total rejected ballots
!align="right"|107
!align="right"|
!align="right"|
|- bgcolor="white"
!align="right" colspan=3|Turnout
!align="right"|%
!align="right"|
!align="right"|
|}

References

External links

BarryPenner.com - Official site

1966 births
Lawyers in British Columbia
British Columbia Liberal Party MLAs
Canadian Mennonites
Canadian King's Counsel
Canadian people of German descent
Living people
Members of the Executive Council of British Columbia
People from Chilliwack
People from Kitimat
Simon Fraser University alumni
University of Victoria alumni
Attorneys General of British Columbia
University of Victoria Faculty of Law alumni
21st-century Canadian politicians
University of the Fraser Valley alumni